Mayfield is a village in Cuyahoga County, Ohio, United States. The village is officially named Mayfield, but is commonly referred to as Mayfield Village. Mayfield Village was originally part of Mayfield Township and is now a suburb of Cleveland. The population was 3,460 at the 2010 census.

Geography
Mayfield is located at  (41.547902, -81.443586).

Mayfield Village is bordered by Highland Heights to the west, Mayfield Heights to the south, Gates Mills to the east, and Willoughby Hills to the north.

Demographics

28.4% were of Italian, 16.4% German, 13.1% Irish, 6.0% English, 5.9% Russian, and 2.4% Slovak, Swedish, and Welsh ancestries.

90.7% spoke English, 3.3% Russian, 2.2% Italian, 1.7% Hungarian, and 0.9% Spanish.

2010 census
As of the census of 2010, there were 3,460 people, 1,531 households, and 987 families living in the village. The racial makeup of the village was 90.1% White, 2.8% African American, 6.0% Asian, 0.1% from other races, and 1.0% from two or more races. Hispanic or Latino of any race were 1.2% of the population.

There were 1,531 households, of which 24.8% had children under the age of 18 living with them, 54.7% were married couples living together, 6.3% had a female householder with no husband present, 3.5% had a male householder with no wife present, and 35.5% were non-families. 31.7% of all households were made up of individuals, and 16.8% had someone living alone who was 65 years of age or older. The average household size was 2.26 and the average family size was 2.87.

The median age in the village was 48.3 years. 19.3% of residents were under the age of 18; 5.9% were between the ages of 18 and 24; 19.7% were from 25 to 44; 30.9% were from 45 to 64; and 24.2% were 65 years of age or older. The gender makeup of the village was 49.6% male and 50.4% female.

2000 census
As of the census of 2000, there were 3,435 people, 1,392 households, and 1,013 families living in the village. The population density was 875.2 people per square mile (338.3/km2). There were 1,471 housing units at an average density of 374.8 per square mile (144.9/km2). The racial makeup of the village was 94.44% White, 1.31% African American, 0.03% Native American, 3.58% Asian, 0.17% from other races, and 0.47% from two or more races. Hispanic or Latino of any race were 0.79% of the population.

There were 1,392 households, out of which 25.9% had children under the age of 18 living with them, 62.6% were married couples living together, 7.5% had a female householder with no husband present, and 27.2% were non-families. 23.1% of all households were made up of individuals, and 12.1% had someone living alone who was 65 years of age or older. The average household size was 2.47 and the average family size was 2.92.

In the village, the population was spread out, with 20.8% under the age of 18, 5.6% from 18 to 24, 22.9% from 25 to 44, 27.4% from 45 to 64, and 23.3% who were 65 years of age or older. The median age was 45 years. For every 100 females there were 92.2 males. For every 100 females age 18 and over, there were 91.6 males.

The median income for a household in the village was $66,048, and the median income for a family was $72,065. Males had a median income of $52,361 versus $34,152 for females. The per capita income for the village was $36,360. About 1.8% of families and 2.6% of the population were below the poverty line, including 2.1% of those under age 18 and 4.8% of those age 65 or over.

Schools

Mayfield Village is a part of the Mayfield City School District, along with Gates Mills, Highland Heights, and Mayfield Heights. The village's only high school is Mayfield High School.

Economy
Mayfield Village is the headquarters of the Progressive Corporation, the third-largest auto insurer in the U.S.

Notable person
Andy Isabella, American football wide receiver

References

External links
 Village website

Villages in Cuyahoga County, Ohio
Villages in Ohio
Cleveland metropolitan area